Baker Street is a London Underground station at the junction of Baker Street and the Marylebone Road in the City of Westminster. It is one of the original stations of the Metropolitan Railway (MR), the world's first underground railway, opened on 10 January 1863.

The station is in Travelcard Zone 1 and is served by five lines. On the Circle and Hammersmith & City lines it is between Great Portland Street and Edgware Road. On the Metropolitan line it is between Great Portland Street and Finchley Road. On the Bakerloo line it is between Regent's Park and Marylebone, and on the Jubilee line it is between St John's Wood and Bond Street.

Location 
The station has entrances on Baker Street, Chiltern Street (ticket holders only) and Marylebone Road. Nearby attractions include Regent's Park, Lord's Cricket Ground, the Sherlock Holmes Museum and Madame Tussauds.

History

Metropolitan Railway – the first underground railway 

In the first half of the 19th century, the population and physical extent of London grew greatly. The congested streets and the distance to the city from the stations to the north and west prompted many attempts to get parliamentary approval to build new railway lines into the city. In 1852, Charles Pearson planned a railway from Farringdon to King's Cross. Although the plan was supported by the city, the railway companies were not interested and the company struggled to proceed. The Bayswater, Paddington, and Holborn Bridge Railway Company was established to connect the Great Western Railway's (GWR) Paddington station to Pearson's route at King's Cross. A bill was published in November 1852 and in January 1853 the directors held their first meeting and appointed John Fowler as its engineer. Several bills were submitted for a route between Paddington and Farringdon. The company's name was also to be changed again, to Metropolitan Railway and the route was approved on 7 August 1854.

Construction began in March 1860; using the "cut-and-cover" method to dig the tunnel. Despite having several accidents during construction, work was complete by the end of 1862 at a cost of £1.3 million. Rail services through the station opened to the public on Saturday, 10 January 1863.

In the next few years, extensions of the line were made at both ends with connections from Paddington to the GWR's Hammersmith and City Railway (H&CR) and at Gloucester Road to the District Railway (DR). From 1871, the MR and the DR operated a joint Inner Circle service between Mansion House and Moorgate Street.

North-western "branch" 
In April 1868, the Metropolitan & St John's Wood Railway (M&SJWR) opened a single-track railway in tunnel to Swiss Cottage from new platforms at Baker Street East (which eventually become the present Metropolitan line platforms). The line was worked by the MR with a train every 20 minutes. A junction was built with the original route at Baker Street, but there were no through trains after 1869.

The M&SJWR branch was extended in 1879 to Willesden Green and, in 1880, to Neasden and Harrow-on-the-Hill. Two years later, the single-track tunnel between Baker Street and Swiss Cottage was duplicated and the M&SJWR was absorbed by the MR.

Bakerloo and Jubilee lines 

In November 1891, a private bill was presented to Parliament for the construction of the Baker Street and Waterloo Railway (BS&WR). The railway was planned to run entirely underground from Marylebone to Elephant & Castle via Baker Street and Waterloo and was approved in 1900. Construction commenced in August 1898 under the direction of Sir Benjamin Baker, W. R. Galbraith and R. F. Church with building work by Perry & Company of Tredegar Works, Bow. Test trains began running in 1905. The official opening of the BS&WR by Sir Edwin Cornwall took place on 10 March 1906. The first section of the BS&WR was between Baker Street and Lambeth North. Baker Street was the temporary northern terminus of the line until it was extended to Marylebone on 27 March 1907, a year after the rest of the line. The B&SWR's station building designed by Leslie Green stood on Baker Street and served the tube platforms with lifts, but these were supplemented with escalators in 1914, linking the Metropolitan line and the Bakerloo line platforms by a new concourse excavated under the Metropolitan line. An elaborately decorated restaurant and tea-room was added above Green's terminal building, the Chiltern Court Restaurant, which was opened in 1913.

On 1 July 1933, the MR and BS&WR amalgamated with other Underground railways, tramway companies and bus operators to form the London Passenger Transport Board (LPTB), and the MR became the Metropolitan line, while the BS&WR became the Bakerloo line of London Transport. However, there was a bottleneck on the Metropolitan line at Finchley Road where four tracks merge into two to Baker Street. LPTB decided to extend the Bakerloo line from Baker Street as a branch line, taking over the existing section between Finchley Road and Stanmore. Construction began in April 1936. On 20 November 1939, following the construction of an additional southbound platform and connecting tube tunnels between Baker Street and Finchley Road stations, the Bakerloo line took over the Metropolitan line's stopping services between Finchley Road and Wembley Park and its Stanmore branch.
 The current Bakerloo ticket hall and escalators to the lower concourse were provided in conjunction with the new service.

After the Victoria line had been completed in the 1960s, the new Jubilee line was proposed which would take a route via Baker Street, Bond Street, Trafalgar Square, Strand, Fleet Street, Ludgate Circus and Cannon Street, then proceeding into southeast London. This new line was to have been called the Fleet line. The Jubilee line added an extra northbound platform and replaced the Bakerloo line service to Stanmore from the station, opening on 1 May 1979.

Circle and Hammersmith & City lines 
The initial route on the Hammersmith & City line was formed by the H&CR, running between Hammersmith and Moorgate. Services were eventually extended to Barking via the DR and shared with the existing MR tracks between Baker Street and Liverpool Street. The route between Hammersmith and Barking was shown on the tube map as part of the Metropolitan line, but since 1990 has been shown separately, the Metropolitan line becoming the route from Aldgate to Baker Street and northwards through "Metro-Land" to Uxbridge, Watford and Amersham.

The circle line was initially formed by the combination of the MR and DR routes, which were between Edgware Road and South Kensington, Edgware Road and Aldgate via King's Cross St Pancras, South Kensington and Mansion House, and a joint railway between Mansion House and Aldgate. Since 1949, the Circle line is shown separately on the map.

Incidents 
On 18 June 1925, electric locomotive No.4 collided with a passenger train when a signal was changed from green to red just as the locomotive was passing it. Six people were injured.

On 23 August 1973, a bomb was found in a carrier bag in the ticket hall. The bomb was defused by the bomb squad. A week later, on 30 August, a member of staff found another bomb left on the overbridge. Again, it was defused without any injury.

The station today 
Baker Street station is the combination of three separate stations, with several booking offices throughout its operational years. Major changes took place in 1891-93 and 1910–12. The first part is the Circle Line station, which has its two platforms now used by the Circle and Hammersmith & City lines. They are situated on a roughly east-to-west alignment beneath Marylebone Road, spanning approximately the stretch between Upper Baker Street and Allsop Place. This was part of the original Metropolitan Railway from Bishop's Road (now Paddington (Circle and Hammersmith & City lines) station to Farringdon Street (now Farringdon) which opened on 10 January 1863.

The platforms serving the main branch of the Metropolitan line towards Harrow, Uxbridge and beyond are located within the triangle formed by Marylebone Road, Upper Baker Street and Allsop Place, following the alignment of Allsop place. This station is the second section which opened on 13 April 1868 by the Metropolitan & St. John's Wood Railway. This was later absorbed by the Metropolitan Railway, which is usually known to them as Baker Street East station.

The final section is the deep-level tube station of the Baker Street & Waterloo Railway (now part of the Bakerloo line), situated at a lower level beneath the site of Baker Street East, opened on 10 March 1906. This part of the station now contains four platforms which are used by both the Bakerloo and Jubilee lines.

This station is a terminus for some Metropolitan line trains, but there is also a connecting curve that joins to the Circle line just beyond the platforms, allowing Metropolitan line through services to run to Aldgate. The deep-level Bakerloo and Jubilee lines platforms are arranged in a cross-platform interchange layout and there are track connections between the two lines just to the north of the station. Access to the Bakerloo and Jubilee lines is only via escalators.

With ten platforms overall, Baker Street has the most London Underground platforms of any station on the network. Since Swiss Cottage and St John's Wood have replaced the former three stations between Finchley Road and Baker Street on the Metropolitan line, it takes an average of five and a half minutes to travel between them. Essentially, the Metropolitan Line operates as a fast service while the Jubilee Line offers local service between the two stations.

As part of the Transported by Design programme of activities, on 15 October 2015, after two months of public voting, Baker Street underground station's platforms were elected by Londoners as one of the 10 favourite transport design icons.

The former Chiltern Court Restaurant above the station is still in use today as the Metropolitan Bar, part of the Wetherspoons pub chain. The rest of the block, known as Chiltern Court and completed by the Metropolitan Railway's in-house architect, Charles Walter Clark in 1929, houses residential apartments.

Sub-surface platforms 

Of the MR's original stations, now the Circle and Hammersmith & City line platforms five and six are the best preserved dating from the station's opening in 1863. Plaques of the Metropolitan Railway's coat of arms along the platform and old plans and photographs depict the station which has changed remarkably little in over a hundred and fifty years. Restoration work in the 1980s on the oldest portions of Baker Street station brought it back to something similar to its 1863 appearance.

The Metropolitan line's platforms one to four were largely the result of the station's rebuild in the 1920s to cater for the increase in traffic on its outer suburban routes. Today the basic layout remains the same with platforms two and three being through tracks for City services to Aldgate from Amersham, Chesham and Uxbridge flanked by terminal platforms one and four which are the domain of services to and from Watford. The northern end of the platforms is in a cutting being surrounded by Chiltern Court and Selbie House the latter of which houses Baker Street control centre responsible for signalling the Metropolitan line from Preston Road to Aldgate, as well as the Circle and Hammersmith & City lines between Baker Street and Aldgate. The southern end of the platforms are situated in a cut and cover tunnel which runs towards Great Portland Street. All Metropolitan line platforms can function as terminating tracks however under normal circumstance only dead ended platforms one and four are used as such.

Deep-level tube platforms 
The Bakerloo line uses platforms eight and nine which date from 10 March 1906 when the Baker Street & Waterloo railway opened between here and Lambeth North (then called Kennington Road). The contraction of the name to "Bakerloo" rapidly caught on, and the official name was changed to match in July 1906.

By the mid-1930s, the Metropolitan line was suffering from congestion caused by the limited capacity of its tracks between Baker Street and Finchley Road stations. To relieve this pressure, the network-wide New Works Programme, 1935–1940 included the construction of new sections of tunnel between the Bakerloo line's platforms at Baker Street and Finchley Road and the replacement of three Metropolitan line stations (Lord's, Marlborough Road and Swiss Cottage) between those points with two new Bakerloo stations (St John's Wood and Swiss Cottage). The Bakerloo line also took over the Metropolitan line's service to Stanmore on 20 November 1939. The branch remained part of the Bakerloo line until 1 May 1979, when similar congestion problems for the Bakerloo line caused by the two branches converging at Baker Street led to the opening of the Jubilee line, initially created by connecting the Stanmore branch to new tunnels bored between Baker Street and Charing Cross. Following refurbishment in the 1980s the original tiling scheme was replaced with tiles depicting the silhouette of Sherlock Holmes who lived at 221B, Baker Street.

The Bakerloo still maintains its connection with the now Jubilee line tracks to Stanmore with tunnels linking from Northbound Bakerloo line platform nine to the Northbound Jubilee line toward St John's Wood and Southbound from Jubilee line platform seven to the Southbound Bakerloo line towards Regent's Park. Although no passenger services operate over these sections they can be used for the transfer of engineering trains and was used to transfer Bakerloo line 1972 stock trains to and from Acton Works as part of a refurbishment programme.

Jubilee line trains use platforms seven and ten, which opened in 1979 when the newly built Jubilee line took over existing Bakerloo line services to Stanmore running through new tunnels from Baker Street to Charing Cross to serve as a relief line to the Bakerloo which by then was suffering from capacity issues. In 1999 the Jubilee line was extended from Green Park to Stratford and made the Jubilee line platforms at Charing Cross redundant after twenty years. The design of the Jubilee line platforms at Baker Street has changed little since being opened with illustrations depicting famous scenes from Sherlock Holmes cases.

Cross platform interchange is provided between Bakerloo and Jubilee lines in both directions.

Station improvements

Step-free access project 
In 2008 TfL proposed a project to provide step-free access to the sub-surface platforms. The project was a TfL-funded Games-enabling project in its investment programme (and not a project specifically funded as a result of the success of the London 2012 Games bid). The project was included in the strategy on accessible transport published by the London 2012 Olympic Delivery Authority and the London Organising Committee of the Olympic and Paralympic Games.

Access to the Metropolitan line platforms 1–4 (serving trains to and from Finchley Road) would be provided by a bridge from the Bakerloo and Jubilee line ticket hall, with a lift from the bridge to each island platform. Through a passage from platforms 1–2, this would also give step-free access to platform 5 (Circle and Hammersmith & City line eastbound trains). Access to platform 6 (Circle and Hammersmith & City line westbound trains) would be provided by demolishing the triangular building outside the station, on the north side of Marylebone Road, and taking over the public pedestrian subway under Marylebone Road to provide a link between a lift up from platform 5 to the subway and a lift at the other end of the subway down to platform 6. The replacement for the triangular building would also act as an emergency exit for the station.

TfL applied for planning permission and listed building consent for providing access to platforms 5 and 6 on 1 October 2008, but the application was subsequently withdrawn. (The part of the proposed scheme to provide step-free access to platforms 1–4 is within TfL's permitted development rights, and so does not require planning permission.) TfL announced on 31 March 2009 that because of budgetary constraints the step-free scheme would be deferred.

Platform lengthening 
In order to accommodate the new, longer S stock trains, which started operating Metropolitan line services in August 2010, platforms 1 and 4 have been extended. However, the Circle and Hammersmith & City line platforms 5 and 6 have not been extended to accommodate their new S7 Stock trains, due to the enclosed nature of the platforms. Instead, selective door operation is employed.

Services

Bakerloo line 

On the Bakerloo line, Baker Street station is between Regent's Park and Marylebone. Trains can terminate at Queen's Park, Stonebridge Park, or Harrow and Wealdstone to the north, and Piccadilly Circus, Lambeth North or Elephant & Castle to the south.

The typical service pattern in trains per hour (tph) operated during off-peak hours is:
 6tph to Harrow & Wealdstone via Queen's Park and Stonebridge Park (Northbound)
 3tph to Stonebridge Park via Queen's Park (Northbound)
 11tph to Queen's Park (Northbound)
 20tph to Elephant & Castle (Southbound)
Weekday peak service operates with one or two additional Queen's Park-Elephant & Castle trains per hour, and Sunday service operates with two fewer Queen's Park-Elephant & Castle trains per hour during the core of the day.

Jubilee line 

On the Jubilee line, the station is situated between Bond Street to the south and St John's Wood to the north. Southbound trains usually terminate at Stratford and North Greenwich although additional turn back points are provided at Green Park, Waterloo, London Bridge, Canary Wharf and West Ham. Northbound trains usually terminate at Stanmore, Wembley Park and Willesden Green although additional turn back points are available at Finchley Road, West Hampstead and Neasden.

The typical off-peak service in trains per hour (tph) is:
 20tph Southbound to Stratford
 6tph Southbound to North Greenwich
 16tph Northbound to Stanmore
 5tph Northbound to Wembley Park
 5tph Northbound to Willesden Green
The Night tube service (Friday night to Saturday morning & Saturday night to Sunday morning) in trains per hour is:
 6tph Southbound to Stratford
 6tph Northbound to Stanmore

Circle line 
The station is between Great Portland Street and Edgware Road on this line as well on the Hammersmith & City line.

The typical service in trains per hour is:
6tph Clockwise to Edgware Road via King's Cross St Pancras, Liverpool Street, Tower Hill and Victoria
6tph Anti-clockwise to Hammersmith via Paddington

Hammersmith & City line 
Between 1 October 1877 and 31 December 1906 some services on the H&CR were extended to Richmond over the London and South Western Railway (L&SWR) via its station at Hammersmith (Grove Road).

The station is between Great Portland Street and Edgware Road on this line, as with the Circle line.

The typical off-peak service in trains per hour (tph) is:
6tph Eastbound to Barking or Plaistow
6tph Westbound to Hammersmith

Metropolitan line 

The Metropolitan line is the only line to operate an express service although currently this is mostly southbound in the morning peaks and northbound in the evening peaks. Southbound fast services run non-stop between Moor Park, Harrow-on-the-Hill and Finchley Road whilst semi-fast services run non stop between Harrow-on-the-Hill and Finchley Road. Northbound fast and semi-fast services call additionally at Wembley Park.

The station is situated between Great Portland Street sharing tracks with the Circle and Hammersmith & City lines in the East and Finchley Road Station to the North. Southbound trains may terminate here and return north towards Uxbridge, Amersham, Chesham, or Watford, where platforms 1 and 4 are used.

The off-peak service in trains per hour is:
 12tph Southbound to Aldgate
 4tph Southbound services terminate here
 2tph Northbound to Amersham (all stations)
 2tph Northbound to Chesham (all stations)
 4tph Northbound to Watford (all stations)
 8tph Northbound to Uxbridge (all stations)

Connections 
London Buses routes 13, 18, 27, 30, 74, 113, 139, 189, 205, 274, 453 and night routes N18, N27, N74, N113 and N205 serve the station.

Points of interest 
Royal Academy of Music
Madame Tussauds
Sherlock Holmes Museum

In popular culture 
The Metropolitan Bar above Baker Street station is featured in Metro-Land, a 1973 documentary film by John Betjeman in which he reminiscences about its genteel origins as the Chiltern Court Restaurant, which formed part of the block, Chiltern Court, which Clark constructed above the station.

The excavation of Baker Street for the Underground can be seen in a scene of the 2011 film Sherlock Holmes: A Game of Shadows, set in 1891.

See also 
Baker Street (song) by Gerry Rafferty

Notes and references

Notes

References

Bibliography

External links 

Oldest Portion of Baker Street Station

 (restoration) 

Bakerloo line stations
Circle line (London Underground) stations
Hammersmith & City line stations
Metropolitan line stations
Jubilee line stations
London Underground Night Tube stations
Tube stations in the City of Westminster
Former Metropolitan Railway stations
Railway stations in Great Britain opened in 1863
Former Baker Street and Waterloo Railway stations
Railway stations in Great Britain opened in 1906
Grade II* listed railway stations
Grade II* listed buildings in the City of Westminster
Charles Walter Clark railway stations